Albert Krajmer (23 April 1933 – 10 February 2014) was a Slovak rower who competed for Czechoslovakia. He competed at the 1956 Summer Olympics in Melbourne with the men's double sculls where they were eliminated in the round one repêchage.

References

External links
 
 
 

1933 births
2014 deaths
Czechoslovak male rowers
Slovak male rowers
Olympic rowers of Czechoslovakia
Rowers at the 1956 Summer Olympics
People from Nové Zámky District
Sportspeople from the Nitra Region
European Rowing Championships medalists